Malacca Coastal Bridge is a river bridge in box girder shape in Malacca City in Malacca, Malaysia. The bridge crosses Malacca River. The bridge is built as a bypass of Malacca City and is built to shorten the travel distance between Bandar Hilir to Kampung Limbongan town area from 10 km (estimated) to 5 km (Estimated).

History
The construction of the bridge was proposed in 1996 and it was part of the Malacca coastal development project such as Mahkota Parade, Taman Melaka Raya, Taman Kota Laksamana and Malacca Island. When the reclamation land for the project was done in the late 1990s. Construction of the bridge began in 1998 and was completed in 2001.

See also
 Transport in Malaysia

2001 establishments in Malaysia
Bridges completed in 2001
Bridges in Melaka